Sedlacekia is a genus of leaf beetles in the subfamily Eumolpinae. It contains only one species, Sedlacekia  pandani. It is distributed in New Guinea. The genus is named after Josef and Marie Sedlacek, who collected part of the type material.

References

Eumolpinae
Monotypic Chrysomelidae genera
Beetles of Oceania
Insects of New Guinea
Endemic fauna of New Guinea